The Philomath Bulletin was a weekly newspaper of Philomath, Oregon, United States founded in June 2007. As of 2015, it has ceased publication.

References

Newspapers published in Oregon
Benton County, Oregon
Publications established in 2007